In the Jam Jar is a Canadian short drama film, directed by Colin Nixon and released in 2021. A tribute to maternal love, the film stars France Castel as Joan, a dying woman who is being cared for by her son Dan (Alain Goulem).

Despite featuring francophone actors, the film's dialogue was shot in English and subtitled in French for francophone audiences.

The film was screened in July 2021 as part of Telefilm Canada's annual Not Short on Talent showcase of Canadian short films at the Cannes Film Market. It had its official public premiere at the 2021 Festival du nouveau cinéma, where it won both the juried and audience-choice awards for Best Canadian Short Film.

The film was a Canadian Screen Award nominee for Best Live Action Short Drama at the 10th Canadian Screen Awards, and a Prix Iris nominee for Best Live Action Short Film at the 24th Quebec Cinema Awards.

References

External links
 

2021 films
2021 short films
Canadian drama short films
Films shot in Montreal
Films set in Montreal
Quebec films
2020s English-language films
2020s Canadian films